Forrest Adair (1865 – 1936) was a real estate dealer.  He was the son of real-estate and streetcar developer Col. George Washington Adair and lived in Atlanta, Georgia He served as Fulton County (Georgia) Commissioner from 1895 until 1903.  A member of the Yaarab Temple, he served as Potentate and was instrumental in the founding of the Scottish Rite Children's Hospital and the Shriners Hospitals for Children.  Along with his brother, George Adair, Jr., he developed neighborhoods throughout what is the Atlanta, Georgia, area, including Adair Park, West End Park (now known as Westview), and, in conjunction with Asa Candler, Druid Hills.

See also
 Forrest Adair's 1920 "Bubbles" speech calling for the establishment of Shriners Hospitals for Children.

References

 Chronological List of Members of the Fulton County Board of Commissioner 
 "Scottish Rite Hospital", from masonicinfo.com  
 "Emory Village", from emoryvillage.org 
 W. O. Saunders, "Let's Stop Blowing Bubbles," Collier's Weekly, 13 Sept. 1924; reprinted in The Builder, vol. X, No. 10.
 Orient of Georgia, Ancient & Accepted Scottish Rite of Freemasonry, "The Georgia Scottish Rite Charities" 
 Noble Forrest Adair (Yaarab Shriners, Atlanta, Georgia), "The Bubbles Speech" (argument presented at the annual meeting of the Imperial Council of the Ancient Arabic Order, Nobles of the Mystic Shrine, in Portland, Oregon on 22 June 1920), reprinted in Hart, supra, 20–24.
 John D. McGilvray, The Shriners Finest Hour (San Francisco, California: Board of Governors, Shriners Hospital for Crippled Children, 1955)
 W. Freeland Kendrick, "Echoes of the Past," Shrine News, [publishing information unknown, presumably in the early 1940s], see Hart, supra, 25–27.

1865 births
1936 deaths
American real estate businesspeople
History of Atlanta
Businesspeople from Atlanta